The inaugural women's tournament in the 2009 Rugby World Cup Sevens was held at The Sevens in Dubai alongside the men's tournament. The tournament was held from 6 March to 7 March, with Australia beating New Zealand 15−10 at the final.

Teams

16 teams took part in this tournament

Squads

Pool Stages

Pool A
{| class="wikitable" style="text-align: center;"
|-
!width="200"|Team
!width="40"|Pld
!width="40"|W
!width="40"|D
!width="40"|L
!width="40"|PF
!width="40"|PA
!width="40"|+/–
!width="40"|Pts
|-bgcolor=ccffcc
|align=left|
|3||2||0||1||47||32||+15||7
|-bgcolor=ccffcc
|align=left|
|3||2||0||1||96||26||+70||7
|-bgcolor=ffcccc
|align=left|
|3||1||0||2||48||81||–33||5
|-bgcolor=ffcccc
|align=left|
|3||1||0||2||29||81||–52||5
|}

Pool B
{| class="wikitable" style="text-align: center;"
|-
!width="200"|Team
!width="40"|Pld
!width="40"|W
!width="40"|D
!width="40"|L
!width="40"|PF
!width="40"|PA
!width="40"|+/-
!width="40"|Pts
|-bgcolor=ccffcc
|align=left|
|3||3||0||0||93||0||+93||9
|-bgcolor=ccffcc
|align=left|
|3||2||0||1||50||17||+33||7
|-bgcolor=ffcccc
|align=left|
|3||1||0||2||31||51||–20||5
|-bgcolor=ffcccc
|align=left|
|3||0||0||3||10||116||–106||3
|}

Pool C
{| class="wikitable" style="text-align: center;"
|-
!width="200"|Team
!width="40"|Pld
!width="40"|W
!width="40"|D
!width="40"|L
!width="40"|PF
!width="40"|PA
!width="40"|+/-
!width="40"|Pts
|-bgcolor=ccffcc
|align=left|
|3||3||0||0||50||12||+38||9
|-bgcolor=ccffcc
|align=left|
|3||2||0||1||90||19||+71||7
|-bgcolor=ffcccc
|align=left|
|3||1||0||2||12||67||–55||5
|-bgcolor=ffcccc
|align=left|
|3||0||0||3||29||83||–54||3
|}

Pool D
{| class="wikitable" style="text-align: center;"
|-
!width="200"|Team
!width="40"|Pld
!width="40"|W
!width="40"|D
!width="40"|L
!width="40"|PF
!width="40"|PA
!width="40"|+/-
!width="40"|Pts
|-bgcolor=ccffcc
|align=left|
|3||3||0||0||120||0||+120||9
|-bgcolor=ccffcc
|align=left|
|3||2||0||1||43||30||+13||7
|-bgcolor=ffcccc
|align=left|
|3||1||0||2||17||69||–52||5
|-bgcolor=ffcccc
|align=left|
|3||0||0||3||7||88||–81||3
|}

Knockout

Bowl

Plate

Cup

References

External links

 
2009
Women
2009 in women's rugby union